Alice Elizabeth Barrett Kitchin (19 February 1873 – 17 June 1950) was an Australian nurse who served in World War I with the Australian Army Nursing Service.

Early life
Alice was born in Amherst, Victoria, near Ballarat in 1873 to parents William Barret Kitchin, and Mary Ann Conway. Alice had 5 siblings – William (1872–1872), Albert Henry (1874–5), Mary Ann (1876–1946), Louisa (1879–1898) and Margaret (1878–1966). After William died in 1879, Mary Ann with her surviving children moved to Melbourne. Mrs Kitchin was unwell, and largely cared for by Alice, along with her nursing study and duties.
By 1905 Alice, her mother and sisters Mary Ann, and Margaret were living at 337 Sydney Road Brunswick, the sisters’ dressmakers’ shop. The sisters participated in the social activities of the Shamrock Club, Alice and 5 other early enlistees being farewelled from there in 1914.
Mary Ann died in 1929, and the three sisters had moved to Alençon, Point Nepean Road, Edithvale by 1936, with Margaret and Mary Ann continuing as dressmakers. 
Alice died at Chelsea in June 1950 and is buried in Melbourne Cemetery.

Education
Alice studied nursing at the Royal Melbourne Hospital, gaining her certificate in 1899 and registration in 1901. She studied for a further qualification on infectious diseases in 1906. 

The Australian Army Nursing Service reserves was formed in 1902 to provide volunteer civilian nurses in the event of a national emergency, and Alice joined them in 1907.

War experiences
Enlisting as a nursing sister with the 1st Australian General Hospital on 26 September 1914, 
Alice sailed with 5 other nurses: Mary Finlay, Evelyn Conyers, Jane Lempriere, Sister Hilda Ridderwold Samsing, and Jessie McHardy White.

The nurses sailed with the 8th Battalion (Australia) aboard the HMAT Benalla, on 19 October 1914, arriving in Egypt on 4 December. Alice ended up nursing many men of the 8th as they fought at Gallipoli, and later in France.

Middle East
Her first role was at the 2nd Australian General Hospital at Mena, 12 miles east of Cairo at the foot of the pyramids, under the direction of Sister Nellie Gould.

Moving to 1st Australian General Hospital at the Palace Hotel Heliopolis in February 1915, under Matron Jane Bell, a colleague from Alice's days at Melbourne Hospital. 
At the end of April, after the Gallipoli offensive, wounded soldiers began to arrive in Alexandria.
 
"By this time perhaps all the men we looked on as friends have been blotted out of existence. All our leave has been stopped until further notice. Another turmoil of a day. I have charge of 42 officers, some of them good friends. The work is harrowing. If we had been nursing strange troops we may have felt it less, but among our own people the horrors of war are brought home. Almost everyone on the nursing or medical staff has a relation or friend at the front so you dread the latest news…."

In May 1915, Matron Bell offered Alice and Hilda Samsing the opportunity to travel back to Australia with convalescent patients.  They declined the offer and requested instead a posting to a hospital ship, transporting wounded soldiers away from the front.

On June 7 they heard that they were to join the medical crew on HS Gascon.
The Gascon ferried wounded soldiers between the Gallipoli Peninsula, field hospitals and permanent hospitals.

Alice wrote at this time: 
"One wonders when the awful destruction of life will stop. There seems no safe spot for them anywhere on this rough spot, except in their dugouts. They seem to take their lives in their hands whenever they move about for water food or air or anything…. The crack of rifles and occasionally machine guns are plainly audible. Somehow, we never think of any danger to this boat, and everyone believes the Turks play the game fairly."
After the evacuation from Gallipoli in December 1915, Alice returned to nursing in Cairo at Heliopolis.

France
Alice was transferred to Boulogne, France in April 1916 to the 2nd Australian General Hospital, and later to Rouen and casualty clearing stations. After living through the heat of a Mediterranean summer – a bitterly cold European winter meant the thick woollen uniforms so oppressive in Egypt – and the source of conflict with the hierarchy were welcome in France.
Alice was admitted with bronchitis to hospital in Rouen in December 1916, and was then evacuated to England on HMHS Aberdonian in January 1917.

England
Once recovered, Alice served at Harefield and Dartford with the No. 1 Australian Auxiliary Hospital. Harefield was a hospital for soldiers who had been permanently incapacitated by their injuries.  A persistent cough saw her spend further time at St Alban's Convalescent Home for Australian Nurses in February 1918.

Alice noted in her diary on the 19th of October 1917 – "3 years since we left home – it sometimes seems like 3 centuries ago."

On 21 March 1918 the German army launched the Spring Offensive, designed to drive a wedge between the French and British armies on the Western Front, before American troops entered the war – 
"The Great offensive has started, God grant it may be a victory for us, though the casualties are bound to be awful for both sides...a great anxiety overshadows us night and day and one feels that for he few we know or belong to us in that awful maelstrom it is impossible to entertain much hope."

After the armistice, Alice successfully applied for education leave to attend a course at the Royal Sanitary Institute in Buckingham Palace Road. To return home, Alice joined the nursing staff aboard HS Kanowna, arriving back in Melbourne, Australia on the 23 October 1919.

Awards
Alice was awarded the 1914–15 Star Medal, the British War Medal, and the Victory Medal.

References

External links 
 Writing the war: Alice Kitchen

Australian military nurses
Australian diarists
Australian women of World War I
1873 births
1950 deaths
Burials at Melbourne General Cemetery
People from Melbourne